Honggeertu is a volcanic field in China, in the Nei Mongol Province.

The field is formed by twelve basaltic cinder cones. Some of the cones formed on a fault. It may be of Holocene age. Young lava flows from this field look much younger than these of Quaternary volcanoes in the neighbourhood. The volcanism may originate in the tectonic effects of the movement of the Ordos Block. Seismic tomography indicates the presence of a low velocity region at the volcano.

References

External links 
 Petrogenesis and tectonic setting of the granites in Honggeertu area, central Inner Mongolia：Constraints from LA-ICP-MS zircon U-Pb chronology and geochemistry

Volcanoes of China
Quaternary volcanism
Volcanic fields